Kommos may refer to:

 Kommos (Crete) - a Bronze Age archeological site in Crete
 Kommós (theatre) - a lyrical song of lamentation in an Athenian tragedy